Yarabad (also Romanized as Yārābād; also known as Pārābād and Yaryiabad (Persian: ياري آباد), also Romanized as Yāryīābād) is a village in Kakavand-e Sharqi Rural District, Kakavand District, Delfan County, Lorestan Province, Iran. At the 2006 census, its population was 86, in 16 families.

References 

Towns and villages in Delfan County